Cambridge Studies in the History of Art is a book series of the history of art published by Cambridge University Press. The editors were Francis Haskell, a fellow of King's College, Cambridge, and Nicholas Penny of the National Gallery. The first volume in the series was El Greco and his patrons: Three major projects by Richard G. Mann, published in 1986, in which Mann investigated three of El Greco's six major projects and the patrons responsible for them.

Volumes

1980s
El Greco and his patrons: Three major projects, Richard G. Mann, 1986.  
A bibliography of salon criticism in Second Empire Paris, Christopher Parsons & Martha Ward (compilers), 1986. 
Giotto and the language of gesture, Moshe Barasch, 1987. 
Power and display in the seventeenth century: The arts and their patrons in Modena and Ferrara, Janet Southorn, 1988.

1990s
Pavel Kuznetsov: His life and art, Peter Stupples, 1990. 
A bibliography of salon criticism in Paris from the Ancien Regime to the restoration 1699-1827, Neil MacWilliam, 1991. 
A bibliography of salon criticism in Paris from the July Monarchy to the Second Republic, 1831-1851, Neil MacWilliam, 1991. 
Marcantonio Franceschini and the Liechtensteins: Prince Johann Adam Andreas and the decoration of the Liechtenstein Garden Palace at Rossau-Vienna, Dwight C. Miller, 1991. 
The Oriental obsession: Islamic inspiration in British and American art and architecture 1500-1920, John Sweetman, 1991. 
Pittoresco: Marco Boschini, his critics, and their critiques of painterly brushwork in seventheenth-and eighteenth-century Italy, Philip Lindsay Sohm, 1991. 
Japonisme in western painting from Whistler to Matisse, Klaus Berger, translated by David Britt, 1992.
Palma Vecchio, Philip Rylands, 1992. 
The letters of Lucien to Camille Pissarro, 1883-1903, Anne Thorold (editor), 1993. 
Sir Richard Westmacott, sculptor, Marie Busco, 1994. 
The art of Giovanni Antonio da Pordenone: Between dialect and language, Charles E. Cohen, 1996.

References 

Cambridge University Press books
Art history books
Series of non-fiction books